2C-P is a relatively potent and long acting psychedelic phenethylamine of the 2C family.

Chemistry
2C-P is 2,5-dimethoxy-4-n-propylphenethylamine.  The full name of the chemical is 2-(2,5-dimethoxy-4-propylphenyl)ethanamine.  The hydrochloride salt is the most common form, normally found as a white powder, or white crystals.

Effects
2C-P produces intense hallucinogenic, psychedelic, and entheogenic effects including open eye visualizations and closed-eye visualizations. It can have a very slow onset if ingested, and peak effects reportedly do not occur for 3 to 5 hours. The peak lasts for five to ten hours, with the overall experience lasting up to 20 hours.

Dose
In his book PiHKAL, Shulgin listed 2C-P's dosage range as 6–10 mg and wrote that while most reports with dosages between 6 and 12 mg were favorable, "there was one report of an experience in which a single dosage of 16 mg was clearly an overdose, with the entire experiment labeled a physical disaster, not to be repeated." He cautioned readers regarding dosing with 2C-P by commenting that "a consistent observation is that there may not be too much latitude in dosage between that which would be modest, or adequate, and that which would be excessive. The need for individual titration would be most important with this compound." 2C-P is one of the most potent compounds in the 2C family of psychedelics, rivaled only by 2C-TFM.

Overdoses and deaths 
Unknown (or unreported) dosages taken by teenagers at a Connecticut, US concert in September 2013 caused seven people to require emergency medical help including CPR and defibrillation to resuscitate some of them, with all seven being taken to a hospital and four of those being hospitalized until at least the next day.  It was reported that none of the overdose victims died while CNN's "OutFront" blog claimed the police called it a "mass casualty event" blaming the problems on 2C-P and drugs apparently being sold as "Molly", a common name for MDMA.

Louella Fletcher-Michie, the daughter of actor John Michie, died from a 2C-P overdose in September 2017 at the Bestival festival in Dorset, UK, the first reported death from 2C-P. Her boyfriend was found guilty of manslaughter, for giving her the drug and failing to act to help her for over six hours after she overdosed. His conviction for failing to act was quashed in August 2020.

Legal status
2C-P is not scheduled by the United Nations' Convention on Psychotropic Substances.

Canada
As of October 31, 2016; 2C-P is a controlled substance (Schedule III) in Canada.

China
As of October 2015 2C-P is a controlled substance in China.

Denmark 
In Denmark, 2C-P has been added to the list of Schedule B controlled substances.

Germany
2C-P is an Anlage I controlled drug.

Sweden 
The Riksdag added 2C-P to Narcotic Drugs Punishments Act under swedish schedule I ("substances, plant materials and fungi which normally do not have medical use" ) as of August 16, 2016, published by Medical Products Agency (MPA) in regulation HSLF-FS 2016:80 listed as 2,5-dimetoxi-4-propylfenetylamin.

United Kingdom
2C-P is a Class A drug in the UK.

United States
2C-P was placed into Schedule I (with the DEA Drug Code of 7524) making it illegal to possess, distribute and/or manufacture without a license in the United States by an act of the US Congress on July 9, 2012 when US President Barack Obama signed the Synthetic Drug Abuse Prevention Act of 2012 (SDAPA). The law came into effect on January 4, 2013.

In popular culture 
In the first episode of the CBS fictional TV drama series Battle Creek, a local police detective is tasked with solving a double murder where an assisting FBI agent claims the victims were operating a clandestine laboratory manufacturing 2C-P.

References

External links
 Erowid 2C-P Vault

2C (psychedelics)
Designer drugs